Rapa das Bestas (The Shave of the Beasts) is the name of an operation that involves cutting the manes of the wild horses who live free at the mountains in a semi-feral state and that are performed in the curros (enclosed which retain the horses) held in various locations in Galicia (Spain). Those horses live in mountains owned by the villages (a form of property derived from the Suevi, around 8th century) and have several owners (private owners, the parish or the village), each year the foal are marked and the adults shaved and deloused, and then freed again to the mountains.

The best known is the Rapa das Bestas of Sabucedo, in the city hall of A Estrada, which lasts three days: the First Saturday, Sunday and Monday in July. In fact, the name given to the celebration (Rapa das Bestas of Sabucedo), while in most places speaking about curros, including curros de Valga, etc.

Locations

See also 
 Rapa das Bestas of Sabucedo
 Fiestas of National Tourist Interest of Spain

References

External links 
 Web oficial de Rapa das bestas de Sabucedo

Equestrian sports
Galician culture
Festivals in Spain
Tourist attractions in Galicia (Spain)